The Communist Party of India (Marxist) (abbreviated as CPI(M) or CPM) is a communist political party in India that formed as the result of a split in the Communist Party of India (CPI) in 1964. It has the status of a "national party" in India and has headed state governments in three of the states in the country.

A chief minister is the head of government of each of the twenty-eight states and three union territories (Delhi, Jammu and Kashmir and Puducherry). In accordance with the Constitution of India, the governor is a state's de jure head, but de facto executive authority rests with the chief minister. Following elections to the state legislative assembly, the state's governor usually invites the party (or coalition) with a majority of seats to form the government. The governor appoints the chief minister, whose council of ministers are collectively responsible to the assembly. Given the confidence of the assembly, the chief minister's term is for five years and is subject to no term limits.

, nine people from the CPI(M) have held the position of a chief minister — four in Kerala, three in Tripura, and two in West Bengal, out of which only one — Pinarayi Vijayan is incumbent.

Chief ministers from the Communist Party of India (Marxist)
Key
 – Incumbent chief minister

See also
List of current Indian chief ministers
List of current Indian deputy chief ministers
List of longest-serving Indian chief ministers
List of female chief ministers in India
List of chief ministers from the Bharatiya Janata Party
List of chief ministers from the Indian National Congress

Notes

References

External links